William Hutchinson (July 1870 – July 1943) was an English footballer who played in the Football League for Stoke.

Career
Hutchinson was born in Stoke-upon-Trent and played for Fenton Red Star before joining Stoke in 1888. He made just one appearance for Stoke in the Football League which came in a 2–1 defeat away at Derby County in January 1889. He joined Football Alliance side Long Eaton Rangers at the end of the season.

Career statistics

References

1870 births
1943 deaths
Footballers from Stoke-on-Trent
English footballers
Association football outside forwards
Stoke City F.C. players
Long Eaton Rangers F.C. players
English Football League players